Alejandro 'Álex' Miguel Arias de Haro (born 13 June 1989) is a Spanish footballer who plays as a winger for Calahorra.

Club career
Born in Avilés, Asturias, Arias began his career with Real Oviedo, making his senior debuts in the 2006–07 campaign in the Segunda División B. In 2007, he moved to RCD Espanyol, being initially assigned to the youth setup and appearing rarely with the reserves also in the third tier.

In the 2008 summer Arias was loaned to Tercera División club CE Premià, and joined Moratalla CF in 2009 also on loan. He terminated his contract with the Pericos in June 2010, and continued to appear in the third tier in the following seasons, representing Marino de Luanco and Real Avilés. With the latter he scored a career-best 15 goals, as the club missed out promotion in the play-offs.

On 20 June 2014 Arias signed a two-year deal with Segunda División side CD Numancia. He played his first match as a professional on 31 August, coming on as a late substitute in a 1–2 away loss against Real Betis.

On 13 January 2015, after appearing sparingly, Arias was loaned to Avilés until June. In August 2016, after spending a year in prison, he returned to Avilés on a permanent contract.

On 2 July 2021, he joined Primera División RFEF club Calahorra.

Personal life
On 15 August 2011 Arias was involved in a car accident, killing two people by driving drunk in a small town near Salamanca, but was only tried in January 2015. He was arrested in August after being found guilty, receiving a four-year sentence.

References

External links

1989 births
Living people
People from Avilés
Spanish footballers
Footballers from Asturias
Association football wingers
Segunda División players
Segunda División B players
Primera Federación players
Tercera División players
Real Oviedo players
RCD Espanyol B footballers
CE Premià players
Marino de Luanco footballers
Real Avilés CF footballers
CD Numancia players
Coruxo FC players
CD Calahorra players
Spanish people convicted of murder
People convicted of murder by Spain
2001 murders in Spain